Oakdale High School is an American public high school located in Frederick County, Maryland, in Ijamsville, near the city of Frederick.

History
The school's building was built in 2008 to temporarily hold Linganore High School while Linganore's original building was being renovated. In 2010, the school opened as Oakdale High School with only ninth and tenth grade. In the 2011–2012 school year, an eleventh grade was added, and finally, the next year, Oakdale had in its attendance all four grades. The first senior class from Oakdale graduated in June 2013.

Athletics championships

Notable alumni
Zach Thomas, basketball player

References

External links

 

Public high schools in Maryland
Schools in Frederick County, Maryland
2010 establishments in Maryland
Educational institutions established in 2010